Emmanuel Appiah may refer to:
 Emmanuel Appiah (entrepreneur) (born 1987), Ghanaian entrepreneur 
 Emmanuel Appiah (footballer)  (born 1993), Ghanaian footballer